Charlie Collins may refer to:

 Charlie Collins (footballer) (born 1991), English footballer 
 Charlie Collins (politician) (born 1962), American politician
 Charlie Collins (Canadian football) (1946–2012), Canadian football player
 Charlie Collins (musician), Australian singer

See also
Charles Collins (disambiguation)